Lophaster is a genus of starfish within the family Solasteridae.

Species 

 Lophaster asiaticus 
 Lophaster cactorum 
 Lophaster densus 
 Lophaster furcifer 
 Lophaster furcilliger 
 Lophaster gaini 
 Lophaster quadrispinus 
 Lophaster stellans 
 Lophaster suluensis 
 Lophaster tenuis 
 Lophaster verrilli

References 

Solasteridae
Asteroidea genera